The Association of Heads of Independent Girls' Schools (AHIGS), is an association for independent girls' schools, based in North Ryde, New South Wales, Australia.

Established in 1916 as The Association of Head Mistresses of New South Wales, the Association rebranded in 2021 to now trade as Independent Girls' Schools Association (IGSA).  The Association, that as of 2022, comprised 32 member schools, enables inter-school aesthetic, cultural and sporting activities between New South Wales and the Australian Capital Territory's most exclusive independent and Catholic girls' schools.

AHIGS also exists for the purpose of encouraging communication and a bond of co-operation and collegiality among independent girls' schools and their "heads", and working towards advancing the cause of the education of girls through policy development on major issues of concern. The association actively represents its members and the interests of their schools at a political level, through lobbying governments and politicians. Through AHIGS competitions, member schools and their students, are encouraged to value good sportsmanship, participation, team spirit and fairness above undue competitiveness and individualism.

Of New South Wales' fifteen female Rhodes Scholars (1904 to 2009), eight have attended an AHIGS School.

Schools

Members

Former members

History
At the Women's Club on 8 November 1916 a group of eight Headmistresses formed The Association of Head Mistresses of New South Wales, with Miss Edith Badham (SCEGGS Darlinghurst) elected as Foundation President.

The eight founding schools were:
Abbotsleigh, Wahroonga
Normanhurst School, Ashfield (no longer exists).
Kambala, Rose Bay
Meriden School, Strathfield
Methodist Ladies' College (no MLC School), Burwood
The Presbyterian Ladies' College, Croydon (now Presbyterian Ladies' College, Sydney)
Ravenswood School for Girls, Gordon
The Sydney Church of England Girls' Grammar School (now SCEGGS Darlinghurst)

Eligibility for membership was eventually offered to a further 23 girls' schools.

In 1945, a national association was formed, and AHIGS New South Wales heads served as Presidents of that organisation as follows:
1950–1952 Miss D. Knox (PLC Pymble)
1959–1962 Miss P. Bryant (Frensham)
1975–1978 Miss B. Chisholm (SCEGGS)
1985 Miss K. McCredie (Abbotsleigh).
The national organisation was disbanded on 26 August 1985 when the Association of Heads of Independent Schools of Australia was founded.

AHIGS first admitted male heads of girls' schools to membership from 1973 however, so far no male member has been elected to the position of President.

Presidents

Independent Girls' Schools Sporting Association
The thirty-two members' schools of AHIGS are eligible to participate and compete against each other in a number of sporting carnivals and interschool sports through IGSA Sport (formerly known as IGSSA). Secondary school girls compete in team and individual sports at school level and can be selected to represent IGSA Sport as part of the NSWCIS and All Schools sporting pathways.

Archdale debating competition
The Archdale Debating Competition is a competition conducted by the Association of Heads of Independent Girls' Schools for the benefit of students from 24 of its members' schools.

Established in the early 1970s, it is an annual competition conducted over two terms (typically between March and August), with each member school entering a team into each of the divisions. The Archdale Shield is awarded to the school which performs best across the whole competition. The award is determined through an overall points score after the conclusion of the final round.

The competition is named in honour of Helen Elizabeth (Betty) Archdale (August 21, 1907–January 11, 2000), former principal of The Women's College at the University of Sydney (1946–1957), and former headmistress of Abbotsleigh (1958–1970). Betty Archdale was also a talented cricketer, captaining the English women's cricket team in 1934 and 1935. In 1944 Archdale was awarded an Order of the British Empire for her part in getting nurses out of Singapore during World War II. In 1999 she was one of the first ten women to be granted Honorary Life Membership of Marylebone Cricket Club in England. Archdale was listed as an Australian Living Treasure in 1997.

History
Although a number of AHIGS schools offered debating as an extracurricular activity from around the 1920s, it was not until the 1960s that inter-school debating became common among girls' schools.

In 1971, following a debate between Abbotsleigh and a combined high schools team, the decision was made to form a debating organisation for independent girls' schools. This organisation was called 'ISSGDA', and it was made up of sixteen independent schools (girls' and co-educational) divided into four geographic areas for competition purposes.

The first ISSGDA final was contested between Abbotsleigh and Moriah College (the only non-AHIGS school to compete) at Abbotsleigh. The trophy, which Miss Archdale had donated, was won by Abbotsleigh and presented by Miss Kathleen McCredie, the then headmistress of Abbotsleigh. From this point on, the competition became known as the 'Archdale Debating Competition'.

Archdale winners

Festival of Speech
The concept of a 'Festival of Speech' for the Association of Heads of Independent Girls' Schools was first suggested in the early 1990s by Mr. Chris Faisandier, then Principal of Kincoppal-Rose Bay and a member of AHIGS.

Formerly a Principal of Sacred Heart College in New Zealand, Faisandier was involved with the O'Shea Shield Competition in which about twenty schools from the lower North Island of New Zealand participated.

The purpose of the O'Shea Shield Competition was to encourage students to develop skills in the areas of public speaking, debating, analysis and rhetoric. So popular was the competition and so high was the standard of presentation, that the winners of the O'Shea Shield were often featured on New Zealand television.

With the support of the AHIGS membership, Mr Faisandier established the Festival of Speech (then known as the Independent Girls Schools Speaking Competition) in NSW in 1996. The inaugural Festival, spanning Friday evening and all day Saturday, was hosted by Kincoppal-Rose Bay, won by Roseville College, and attended by fifteen schools.

Today the Festival continues to be hosted annually by an AHIGS member school, and some thirty-two schools now participate. Students have the opportunity to perform in the areas of drama, debating, poetry, prose readings, current affairs and religious and ethical questions. The Festival is open to girls from AHIGS schools in years seven to eleven.

Winning schools

See also 
 List of non-government schools in New South Wales

References

External links 
 
 Independent Girls' Schools Sporting Association
 Archdale Debating Competition

 
Australian schools associations